Blackbuck or black buck may refer to:

 Blackbuck, a species of antelope.
 Black Buck, a racist epithet for African-American men.
 Operation Black Buck, a series of bombing raids by the RAF during the Falklands War.
 Royal Regiment of Fusiliers, known as Indian Blackbucks.